Lloyd Glasspool and Harri Heliövaara defeated Rohan Bopanna and Matwé Middelkoop in the final, 6–2, 6–4 to win the men's doubles tennis title at the 2022 Hamburg European Open.

Tim Pütz and Michael Venus were the defending champions, but lost in the semifinals to Glasspool and Heliövaara.

Seeds

Draw

Draw

Qualifying

Seeds

Qualifiers
  Ivan Sabanov /  Matej Sabanov

Lucky losers
  Sander Arends /  David Pel

Qualifying draw

References

External links
 Main draw
 Qualifying draw

Hamburg European Open - Men's doubles
2022 Men's doubles
2022 Hamburg European Open